Gamaliel Díaz Magaña (born 14 February 1981) is a Mexican professional boxer who held the WBC super featherweight title from 2012 to 2013.

Professional career

In December 2005, Díaz upset the undefeated Mexican American future champion, Robert Guerrero, to win the NABF Featherweight Championship. He was defeated by Guerrero in a rematch by 6th round knockout.

He defeated future champion Elio Rojas by split decision, handing the Dominican fighter his first loss, in a WBC Featherweight Title Eliminator. On December 15, 2007, he faced WBC Featherweight champion Jorge Linares, but was defeated by 8th round knockout.

On October 11, 2008 Gamaliel lost to Interim WBC Super Featherweight Champion, Mexican Humberto Soto. The bout was at the Auditorio Centenario in Torreón, Coahuila, Mexico.

After scoring 13 consecutive victories, Diaz challenged WBC Super Featherweight champion Takahiro Ao in his hometown of Tokyo, on December 27, 2012.  As an underdog, he defeated the Japanese champion in a 12 round unanimous decision to claim the title.. Diaz lost the title in his first defense against Japanese boxer Takashi Miura.

Professional boxing record

See also
List of world super-featherweight boxing champions
List of Mexican boxing world champions

References

External links

 

  

1981 births
Living people
Mexican male boxers
Boxers from Michoacán
Featherweight boxers
Super-featherweight boxers
Lightweight boxers
World Boxing Council champions
World super-featherweight boxing champions
20th-century Mexican people
21st-century Mexican people